Ian Johnson (born 11 November 1960) is an English former footballer who played as a defender. He played for Rochdale having signed from non league side Chadderton in 1984. After three seasons with Rochdale, Johnson moved to Altrincham.

References

1960 births
Living people
English footballers
Footballers from Oldham
Association football defenders
Rochdale A.F.C. players
English Football League players